The Oceania Combined Events Championships are an annual athletics competition organized by the Oceania Athletics Association (OAA) for athletes representing the countries of its member associations in men's decathlon and women's heptathlon.  They were established in 2011.  The 2013 edition was held alongside the 2013 Oceania Area Championships.

Editions

Results 
Results can be found on the OAA and on the Athletics Australia websites.

Men's Decathlon

Women's Heptathlon

References

External links
2015 results

Continental athletics championships
Combined events competitions
Recurring sporting events established in 2011
Combined Events